Egypt has one of the oldest civilizations in the world. Thus, it has been in contact with many other civilizations and nations and also has been through so many eras, starting from pre-historic age to the modern age, passing through so many ages such as; Pharonic, Roman, Greek, Islamic and many other ages. Because of this wide variation of ages and the continuous contact with other nations, many museums may be found in Egypt, covering a wide area of these ages.

Following is a sortable list of museums in Egypt.

References

See also

Culture of Egypt
List of museums

Museums
Egypt
List
Museums
Egypt
Museums